Coleophora walsinghami is a moth of the family Coleophoridae. It is found in Turkey.

References

walsinghami
Endemic fauna of Turkey
Moths described in 1990
Moths of Asia